Palazzo Meroni is a historic building situated in Milan, Italy.

History 
The building was built in two phases. The first part of the building, designed by architect Carlo Tenca, was built from 1914 and 1924. The second part of the building, instead, was designed by Cesare Penati and ultimated in 1926.

Description 
The building occupies a triangular-shaped block delimited by the major thoroughfares of Corso Italia and Corso di Porta Romana and by the smaller Via Maddalena. It features an eclectic style with strong Art Nouveau and Beaux-Arts influences. The façades are characterized by rich and elaborate ornamentation. Moreover, the façade on Piazza Missori, at the intersection between Corso Italia and Corso di Porta Romana, is crowned by a large dome.

Gallery

References

External links

Buildings and structures in Milan